Hanunoo, also rendered Hanunó'o, is one of the scripts indigenous to the Philippines and is used by the Mangyan peoples of southern Mindoro to write the Hanunó'o language.

It is an abugida descended from the Brahmic scripts, closely related to Sulat Tagalog, and is famous for being written vertical but written upward, rather than downward as nearly all other scripts (however, it is read horizontally left to right). It is usually written on bamboo by incising characters with a knife. Most known Hanunó'o inscriptions are relatively recent because of the perishable nature of bamboo. It is therefore difficult to trace the history of the script.

Structure
Fifteen basic characters of the Hanunó'o script each represent one of the fifteen consonants  followed by the inherent vowel . Other syllables are written by modifying each of these characters with one of two diacritics (kudlit) which change the vowel sound to /i/ or /u/.  The glyph for /la/ is the same as that for /ra/ but the glyphs for /li/ and /ri/ are distinct, as are those for /lu/ and /ru/.  There are also three glyphs that represent vowels which stand alone (phonetically preceded by a glottal stop, transliterated as q). Final consonants are not written, and so must be determined from context.
Dutch anthropologist Antoon Postma, who went to the Philippines from the Netherlands in the 1950s, introduced the pamudpod sign to indicate a syllable final consonant.  (The pamudpod functions as a virama.) The pamudpod virama is also used in modern Baybayin (used in Tagalog and others).

Note: With the proper rendering support, the Hanunó'o syllable ngu above should resemble an italic V joined with two short, parallel diagonal lines ( \\ ).

The script makes use of single and double danda punctuation characters.

Direction of writing

The Hanunó'o script is conventionally written away from the body (from bottom to top) in columns which go from left to right. Within the columns, characters may have any orientation but the orientation must be consistent for all characters in a text. The characters are typically vertical with the /i/ diacritic on the left and the /u/ on the right, or horizontal with the /i/ on the top and the /u/ on the bottom. Left-handed people often write in mirror image, which reverses both the direction of writing (right to left instead of left to right) and the characters themselves.

Learning the script
Young Hanunó'o men and women (called layqaw) learn the script primarily in order to memorize love songs. The goal is to learn as many songs as possible, and using the script to write the songs facilitates this process.  The script is also used to write letters, notifications, and other documents. The characters are not memorized in any particular order; learners typically begin by learning how to write their name. Literacy among the Hanunó'o people is high despite a lack of formal education in the script.

Examples 
The Hanunó'o people's poetry, Ambahan, consists of seven syllable lines inscribed onto bamboo segments, nodes, musical instruments or other materials using the tip of a knife. Charcoal and other black pigments are then used to make the characters stand out. The poems represent a Mangyan's personal thoughts, feelings or desires. It is recited during social occasions (without accompaniment), in courting ceremonies or when requested.

'You my friend'

Unicode 

The Unicode range for Hanunó'o  is U+1720–U+173F:

See also
Baybayin
Buhid script
Tagbanwa alphabet
Kawi script
Filipino orthography
Kulitan
See multilingual support for fonts supporting Hanunó'o

References

External links
The Entire Hanunóo script
Hanunóo script written clearly

Brahmic scripts
Philippine scripts